A registered jack (RJ) is a standardized telecommunication network interface for connecting voice and data equipment to a service provided by a local exchange carrier or long distance carrier. Registration interfaces were first defined in the Universal Service Ordering Code (USOC) system of the Bell System in the United States for complying with the registration program for customer-supplied telephone equipment mandated by the Federal Communications Commission (FCC) in the 1970s.<ref>AT&T, Registration Interface—Selection and General Information, Bell System Practices, Section 463-400-100 Issue 1, May 1976</ref> They were subsequently codified in title 47 of the Code of Federal Regulations Part 68. Registered jack connections began to see use after their invention in 1973 by Bell Labs.
The specification includes physical construction, wiring, and signal semantics. Accordingly, registered jacks are primarily named by the letters RJ, followed by two digits that express the type. Additional letter suffixes indicate minor variations. For example, RJ11, RJ14, and RJ25 are the most commonly used interfaces for telephone connections for one-, two-, and three-line service, respectively. Although these standards are legal definitions in the United States, some interfaces are used worldwide.

The connectors used for registered jack installations are primarily the modular connector and the 50-pin miniature ribbon connector. For example, RJ11 uses a six-position two-conductor connector (6P2C), RJ14 uses a six-position four-conductor (6P4C) modular jack, while RJ21 uses a 25-pair (50-pin) miniature ribbon connector.

Naming standard
The registered jack designations originated in the standardization process of telephone connections in the Bell System in the United States, and describe application circuits and not just the physical geometry of the connectors. The same modular connector type may be used for different registered jack applications. Modular connectors were developed to replace older telephone installation methods that used hardwired cords or bulkier varieties of telephone plugs.

Strictly, Registered Jack refers to both the female physical connector (modular connector) and specific wiring patterns, but the term is often used loosely to refer to modular connectors regardless of wiring, gender, or use, commonly for telephone line connections, but also for Ethernet over twisted pair, resulting in confusion over the various connection standards and applications. For example, the six-position physical connector, plug and jack, is identically dimensioned and inter-connectable, whether it is wired for one, two, or three lines. These are the RJ11, RJ14, and RJ25 interfaces. The RJ standards designations only pertain to the wiring of the (female) jacks, hence the name Registered Jack. It is commonplace, but not strictly correct, to refer to the unwired connectors or the (male) plugs by these names.

The nomenclature for modular connectors is based on the number of contact positions and the number of wires connected. 6P indicates a six-position modular plug or jack. A six-position modular plug with conductors in only the middle two positions is designated 6P2C; 6P4C has four conductors in the middle positions, and 6P6C has all six equipped.

History and authority
Registration interfaces were created by the Bell System under a Federal Communications Commission order for the standard interconnection between telephone company equipment and customer premises equipment. These interfaces used newly standardized jacks and plugs, primarily based on miniature modular connectors.

The wired communications provider (telephone company) is responsible for delivery of services to a minimum (or main) point of entry (MPOE). The MPOE is a utility box, usually containing surge protective circuitry, which connects the wiring on the customer's property to the communication provider's network. Customers are responsible for all jacks, wiring, and equipment on their side of the MPOE. The intent was to establish a universal standard for wiring and interfaces, and to separate ownership of in-home (or in-office) telephone wiring from the wiring owned by the service provider.

In the Bell System, following the Communications Act of 1934, the telephone companies owned all telecommunications equipment and they did not allow interconnection of third-party equipment. Telephones were generally hardwired, but may have been installed with Bell System connectors to permit portability. The legal case Hush-A-Phone v. United States (1956) and the Federal Communications Commission's (FCC) Carterfone (1968) decision brought changes to this policy, and required the Bell System to allow some interconnection, culminating in the development of registered interfaces using new types of miniature connectors.

Registered jacks replaced the use of protective couplers provided exclusively by the telephone company. The new modular connectors were much smaller and cheaper to produce than the earlier, bulkier connectors that were used in the Bell System since the 1930s. The Bell System issued specifications for the modular connectors and their wiring as Universal Service Order Codes (USOC), which were the only standards at the time. Large customers of telephone services commonly use the USOC to specify the interconnection type and, when necessary, pin-assignments, when placing service orders with a network provider.

When the U.S. telephone industry was reformed to foster competition in the 1980s, the connection specifications became federal law, ordered by the FCC and codified in the Code of Federal Regulations (CFR), Title 47 CFR Part 68, Subpart F, superseded by T1.TR5-1999.

In January 2001, the FCC delegated responsibility for standardizing connections to the telephone network to a new private industry organization, the Administrative Council for Terminal Attachments (ACTA). For this delegation, the FCC removed Subpart F from the CFR and added Subpart G. The ACTA derives its recommendations for terminal attachments from the standards published by the engineering committees of the Telecommunications Industry Association (TIA). ACTA and TIA jointly published the standard TIA/EIA-IS-968, replacing the CFR information.

TIA-968-A, the current version of that standard, details the physical aspects of modular connectors, but not the wiring. Instead, TIA-968-A incorporates the standard T1.TR5-1999, "Network and Customer Installation Interface Connector Wiring Configuration Catalog", by reference. With the publication of TIA-968-B, the connector descriptions have been moved to TIA-1096-A. A registered jack name, such as RJ11, still identifies both the physical connectors and the wiring (pinout) for each application.

Types

The most widely implemented registered jack in telecommunications is the RJ11. This is a modular connector wired for one telephone line, using the center two contacts of six available positions. This configuration is also used for single-line telephones in many countries other than the United States. It may also use a 6P4C connector, to use an additional wire pair for powering lamps on the telephone set. RJ14 is similar to RJ11, but is wired for two lines and RJ25 has three lines. RJ61 is a similar registered jack for four lines, but uses an 8P8C connector.

The RJ45S jack is rarely used in telephone applications but a standard version of the 8P8C modular connector used by RJ45S is used in Ethernet networks and the connector is often referred to as RJ45 in this context.

Many of the basic names have suffixes that indicate subtypes:
C: flush-mount or surface mount
F: flex-mount
W: wall-mount
L: lamp-mount
S: single-line
M: multi-line
X: complex jack

For example, RJ11 comes in two forms: RJ11W is a jack from which a wall telephone can be hung, while RJ11C is a jack designed to have a cord plugged into it. A cord can be plugged into an RJ11W as well.

RJ11, RJ14, RJ25 wiring  

All of these registered jacks are described as containing a number of potential contact positions and the actual number of contacts installed within these positions. RJ11, RJ14, and RJ25 all use the same six-position modular connector, thus are physically identical except for the different number of contacts (two, four and six respectively) allowing connections for one, two, or three telephone lines respectively.

Cords connecting to an RJ11 interface require a 6P2C connector. Nevertheless, cords sold as RJ11 often use 6P4C connectors (six position, four conductor) with four wires. Two of the six possible contact positions connect tip and ring, and the other two conductors are unused.

The conductors other than the two central tip and ring conductors are in practice variously used for a second or third telephone line, a ground for selective ringers, low-voltage power for a dial light, or for anti-tinkle circuitry to prevent pulse dialing phones from sounding the bell on other extensions.

Pinout
Observing the male connector from the cable opening, with prong facing downward, the pins are numbered 1–6, left to right:

Provisioning of power
Some telephones such as the Western Electric Princess and Trimline telephone models require additional power (~6 V AC) for operation of the incandescent dial light. This power is delivered to the telephone set from a transformer by the second wire pair (pins 2 and 5) of the 6P4C connector.

RJ21

RJ21 is a registered jack standard using a modular connector with contacts for up to fifty conductors. It is used to implement connections for up to 25 lines, or circuits that require many wire pairs, such as used in the 1A2 key telephone system. The miniature ribbon connector of this interface is also known as a 50-pin telco connector, CHAMP(AMP), or Amphenol connector, the latter being a genericized trademark, as Amphenol was a prominent manufacturer of these at one time.

A cable color scheme, known as even-count color code, is determined for 25 pairs of conductors as follows: For each ring, the primary, more prominent color is chosen from the set blue, orange, green, brown, and slate, in that order, and the secondary, thinner stripe color from the set of white, red, black, yellow, and violet colors, in that order. The tip conductor color scheme uses the same colors as the matching ring but switches the thickness of the primary and secondary colored stripes. Since the sets are ordered, an orange (color 2 in its set) with a yellow (color 4) is the color scheme for the 4·5 + 2 − 5 = 17th pair of wires. If the yellow is the more prominent, thicker stripe, then the wire is a tip conductor connecting to the pin numbered 25 + the pair #, which is pin 42 in this case. Ring conductors connect to the same pin number as the pair number.

A conventional enumeration of wire color pairs then begins blue (and white), orange (and white), green (and white) and brown (and white), which subsumes a color-coding convention used in cables of 4 or fewer pairs (8 wires or less) with 8P and 6P connectors.

Dual 50-pin ribbon connectors are often used on punch blocks to create a breakout box for private branch exchange (PBX) and other key telephone systems.

RJ45S

The RJ45S, a standard jack once specified for modem or data interfaces, uses a mechanically-keyed variation of the 8P8C body with an extra tab that prevents it from mating with other connectors; the visual difference from the more-common 8P8C is subtle. The original RJ45S keyed 8P2C modular connector had pins 5 and 4 wired for tip and ring of a single telephone line, and pins 7 and 8 shorting a programming resistor, but is obsolete today.

RJ48

RJ48 is a registered jack. It is used for T1 and ISDN termination and local area data channels or subrate digital services. It uses the eight-position modular connector (8P8C).

RJ48C is commonly used for T1 circuits and uses pin numbers 1, 2, 4 and 5.

RJ48X is a variation of RJ48C that contains shorting blocks in the jack so that a loopback is created for troubleshooting when unplugged by connecting pins 1 and 4, and 2 and 5. Sometimes this is referred to as a self-looping jack.

RJ48S is typically used for local area data channels and subrate digital services, and carries one or two lines. It uses a keyed variety of the 8P8C modular connector.

RJ48 connectors are fastened to shielded twisted pair (STP) cables, not the standard unshielded twisted pair (UTP) CAT-(1–5).

RJ61

RJ61 is a physical interface often used for terminating twisted pair type cables. It uses an eight position, eight conductor (8P8C) modular connector.

This pinout is for multi-line telephone use only; RJ61 is unsuitable for use with high-speed data, because the pins for pairs 3 and 4 are too widely spaced for high signaling frequencies. T1 lines use another wiring for the same connector, designated RJ48. Ethernet over twisted pair (10BASE-T, 100BASE-TX and 1000BASE-T) also use a different wiring for the same connector, either T568A or T568B. RJ48, T568A, and T568B are all designed to keep pins close together for pairs 3 and 4.

The flat eight-conductor silver-satin cable traditionally used with four-line analog telephones and RJ61 jacks is also unsuitable for use with high-speed data. Twisted pair cabling is required for data applications. Twisted-pair data patch cable used with the three data standards is not a direct replacement for RJ61 cable, because RJ61 pairs 3 and 4 would be split among different patch cable twisted pairs, causing cross-talk between voice lines 3 and 4 that might be noticeable for long patch cables.

With the advent of structured wiring systems and TIA/EIA-568 (now ANSI/TIA-568) conventions, the RJ61 pinout is falling into disuse. The T568A and T568B standards are used in place of RJ61 so that a single wiring standard in a facility can be used for both voice and data.

Similar jacks and unofficial names
The following RJ-style names do not refer to official ACTA types.

The labels RJ9, RJ10, RJ22 are variously used for 4P4C and 4P2C modular connectors, most typically installed on telephone handsets and their cordage. Telephone handsets do not connect directly to the public network, and therefore have no registered jack designation.RJ45 is often incorrectly used when referring to an 8P8C connector used for ANSI/TIA-568 T568A and T568B and Ethernet. It is distinct from the official RJ45S and ARJ45 interfaces.RJ50'' is often a 10P10C interface, often used for data applications.

The micro ribbon connector, first made by Amphenol, that is used in the RJ21 interface, has also been used to connect Ethernet ports in bulk from a switch with 50-pin ports to a Cat-5 rated patch panel, or between two patch panels. A cable with a 50-pin connector on one end can support six fully wired 8P8C connectors or Ethernet ports on a patch panel with one spare pair. Alternatively, only the necessary pairs for 10/100 Ethernet can be wired allowing twelve Ethernet ports with a single spare pair.

This connector is also used with spring bail locks for SCSI-1 connections. Some computer printers use a shorter 36-pin version known as a Centronics connector.

The 8P8C modular jack was chosen as a candidate for ISDN systems. In order to be considered, the connector system had to be defined by an international standard, leading to the creation of the ISO 8877 standard. Under the rules of the IEEE 802 standards project, international standards are to be preferred over national standards, so when the original 10BASE-T twisted-pair wiring version of Ethernet was developed, this modular connector was chosen as the basis for IEEE 802.3i-1990.

See also
 Audio and video interfaces and connectors generic article
 BS 6312 British equivalent to RJ25
 EtherCON ruggedized 8P8C Ethernet connector
 Key telephone system
 Modified Modular Jack a variation used by Digital Equipment Corporation for serial computer connections, and also for CEA-909 antennas.
 Protea (telephone) South African telephone jack standard
 Telecommunications Industry Association Standards Developing Organization for ACTA

References

External links
 RJ glossary
 ANSI/TIA-968-B documents of FCC specifications from the Administrative Council for Terminal Attachments, section 6.2 in particular
 ANSI/TIA-1096-A
 Administrative Council for Terminal Attachments
 Doing your own telephone wiring
 Connecting a second phone line

Telephone connectors
Computer connectors
Networking hardware